The 1932 Dartmouth Indians football team was an American football team that represented Dartmouth College as an independent during the 1932 college football season. In their sixth season under head coach Jackson Cannell, the Indians compiled a 4–4 record. William Hoffman was the team captain.

Wilbur Powers was the team's leading scorer, with 36 points, from six touchdowns.

Dartmouth played its home games at Memorial Field on the college campus in Hanover, New Hampshire.

Schedule

References

Dartmouth
Dartmouth Big Green football seasons
Dartmouth Indians football